PlumpJack Winery is a boutique winery in Oakville, California specializing in premium Cabernet Sauvignon wines. PlumpJack was the first winery in Napa Valley to use screwcaps as a wine closure on fine wines.  The winery is one of several businesses operated by the PlumpJack Group.  The name of the company is inspired by "the roguish spirit of Shakespeare's Sir John Falstaff (Henry IV), dubbed Plump Jack by Queen Elizabeth."

History
The PlumpJack Group was founded in 1992 by Gavin Newsom, a San Francisco entrepreneur, and Gordon Getty, a San Francisco composer and philanthropist.  They opened a wine store called PlumpJack Wines in the Fillmore neighborhood of San Francisco . Over the next five years, the business expanded to include a boutique hotel and three restaurants. PlumpJack Winery was founded in 1997 when the PlumpJack Group acquired a century-old  vineyard in Napa Valley on Oakville Cross Road. The winery facility and tasting room were designed by Leavitt-Weaver, the same design firm that the PlumpJack Group used for the designs of its restaurants and hotels.

PlumpJack Winery was the first Napa Valley winery to use the Stelvin screwcap closure on its most expensive bottling. John Conover, General Manager of the winery, announced at the Napa Valley Wine Auction that half (150 cases) of PlumpJack's 1997 Reserve Cabernet Sauvignon would be available upon release with a screwcap, and that those bottles would cost $10 USD more than those in the cases closed with cork. At $135 per bottle, many in the wine industry were skeptical of the decision. As part of the screwcap program at PlumpJack, bottles with the screwcap closure from each vintage since 1997 have been analyzed by researchers in the Department of Viticulture and Enology at the University of California at Davis. Bottles using both closure technologies from the 1997 vintage will undergo a more extensive chemical analysis in 2010.

PlumpJack served as a client in Silicon Valley Bank.

Wines

PlumpJack Winery produces Cabernet Sauvignon and Chardonnay varietal wines from Napa Valley grapes, with smaller amounts of Merlot, Syrah, Sauvignon blanc, and Sangiovese. The 2001 PlumpJack Cabernet Sauvignon was named 2004 Wine of the Year by Wine Enthusiast magazine. The 2002 and 2004 vintages of the PlumpJack Cabernet Sauvignon Reserve both received "Extraordinary" wine ratings of 96-100 points from wine critic Robert Parker.

References

External links
PlumpJack Winery official web site

Wineries in Napa Valley
Companies based in Napa County, California
Gavin Newsom